Undibacterium parvum is a Gram-negative, rod-shaped, oxidase positive, non-spore-forming, and low nutrient-loving bacterium of the genus Undibacterium and family  Oxalobacteraceae which was found in drinking water.

References

External links
Type strain of Undibacterium parvum at BacDive -  the Bacterial Diversity Metadatabase

Burkholderiales
Bacteria described in 2011